Jugeumsan is a mountain in Gyeonggi-do, South Korea. Its area extends across the cities of Pocheon, Namyangju, and the county of Gapyeong.

See also
 List of mountains in Korea

Notes

References
 

Mountains of South Korea
Mountains of Gyeonggi Province